The Dutch East India Company (often known as VOC) was a chartered company which issued a considerable series of coinage in bronze, silver and gold for its territories in the Far East between 1602 and 1799.

Background
The Dutch East India Company (VOC) was established as a chartered company in 1602 and was designed to replace a number of earlier Dutch trading companies. To prevent the constant infighting between rival companies, the Dutch States-General gave the company officially recognised status and allowed it fulfill some functions usually reserved for a state. The company's charter allowed it to have its own military forces, make treaties, and coin its own money. It was given full powers to act between the Cape of Good Hope and the Straits of Magellan. The company grew rapidly, founding towns and colonies at Cape Town, Batavia (modern Jakarta), and elsewhere.

Coins
During the 200 years of its existence, VOC issued large quantities and many different patterns of coins. Writers on the subject distinguish between the types produced in the Netherlands for the company and those issued by it locally in Asia. Both types often circulated together, but European coins were more common in some areas than others. Most coins issued for the company carried its distinctive monogram of the interlocked letters "VOC". The most common denominations were the Guilder, Ducatoon, Stiver (or Stuiver) and Doit (Duit). Some fractions, like the Half-Doit, were also produced.

Coins were issued in the Netherlands during the mid-17th century and again from 1744 until its dissolution. Coins were struck in gold, silver, bronze and, unusually, pewter. They were issued by the local mints of the Netherlands, including Holland, Utrecht, Zeeland, Gelderland and Overijssel.

The locally produced coins in Asia display more variation and were produced in gold, silver and bronze. Countermarks are sometimes seen on these coins, either stamped by the company or by local private individuals. Foreign coins, including Japanese Koban or Surat rupees, were sometimes countermarked by the company for its own use.

See also

Netherlands Indies gulden
Dutch East India Company in Indonesia
Spice trade

References

Bibliography

Further reading

External links 

VOC Kenniscentrum

Early Modern currencies
Coins of the Netherlands
Currencies of the Kingdom of the Netherlands
Currencies of Indonesia
Coins of Sri Lanka
Dutch East India Company
Historical currencies of India
Coins of India